.mg is the Internet country code top-level domain (ccTLD) for the Republic of Madagascar.

Second-level domains 
Registrations are taken directly at the second level, or at the third level beneath the following second level names:

 .org.mg: Organizations
 .nom.mg: Individuals
 .gov.mg: Government entities
 .prd.mg: Research projects or programs
 .tm.mg: Registered trademarks
 .edu.mg: Educational institutions
 .mil.mg: Military entities
 .com.mg: Commercial (unrestricted registration)

For some registrations, official documents must be shown indicating the legal status of the registrant.

External links 
 IANA .mg whois information
 .mg domain registration website

Country code top-level domains
Communications in Madagascar

he:סיומת אינטרנט#טבלת סיומות המדינות
sv:Toppdomän#M